Jeffrey S. Guice (born December 22, 1959) is an American Republican politician of Ocean Springs, Mississippi. Since 2008, he has been a member of the Mississippi House of Representatives from the 114th District. He has listed his profession as real estate broker.

He is the chair of the Interstate Cooperation Committee and also sits on the committees for:
 Education 
 Insurance 
 Ports, Harbors and Airports 
 Public Health and Human Services 
 Technology
 Tourism 
 Ways and Means.

Guice is among a group of lawmakers who in 2016 were camping on state-owned property at the Mississippi Fairgrounds, according to members of the group and observations by the Jackson Clarion-Ledger. They called themselves the "Camper Caucus."

References

1959 births
Living people
People from Ocean Springs, Mississippi
Politicians from El Paso, Texas
Republican Party members of the Mississippi House of Representatives
21st-century American politicians